Ryan James Vilade (born February 18, 1999) is an American professional baseball outfielder for the Pittsburgh Pirates of Major League Baseball (MLB). He made his MLB debut in 2021 with the Colorado Rockies.

Amateur career
Vilade was raised in Frisco, Texas and attended Frisco High School as a freshman, sophomore, and junior. In July 2016, after his junior year, he played in the Under Armour All-America Baseball Game at Wrigley Field and won the Home Run Derby with 18 home runs. That fall, he was a member of the 18U United States national team. He moved to Stillwater, Oklahoma before his senior year after his father became an assistant coach for the Oklahoma State Cowboys baseball team. After moving, he enrolled and graduated from Stillwater High School in Stillwater. As a senior, he was named the Oklahoma Gatorade Baseball Player of the Year after batting .410 with seven home runs and 28 RBIs along with slugging .778. He committed to play college baseball for the Oklahoma State Cowboys.

Professional career

Colorado Rockies

The Colorado Rockies selected Vilade in the second round, with the 48th overall selection, of the 2017 Major League Baseball draft. He signed for $1.4 million. After signing, he made his professional debut with the Grand Junction Rockies of the Rookie-level Pioneer League. He hit a home run in his first at-bat and was named to the All-Star game. He spent the whole season with Grand Junction, slashing .308/.438/.496 with five home runs and 21 RBIs in 33 games. He spent 2018 with the Asheville Tourists of the Class A South Atlantic League where he batted .274 with five home runs, 44 RBIs, and 17 stolen bases in 124 games.

Vilade spent 2019 with the Lancaster JetHawks of the Class A-Advanced California League, slashing .303/.367/.466 with 12 home runs, 71 RBIs, and 24 stolen bases. He led the minor leagues with 13 sacrifice flies. Prior to the 2020 season, which was eventually cancelled due to the COVID-19 pandemic, Vilade began periodically playing in the outfield in addition to shortstop and third base. To begin the 2021 season, Vilade was assigned to the Albuquerque Isotopes of the Triple-A West. Defensively, he moved to left field and right field. In June, Vilade was selected to play in the All-Star Futures Game at Coors Field. Over 108 games with the Isotopes, Vilade slashed .286/.339/.420 with seven home runs, 43 RBIs, 27 doubles, and 12 stolen bases.

On September 18, 2021, Colorado selected Vilade's contract and promoted him to the active roster to make his MLB debut that day versus the Washington Nationals at Nationals Park. He started in left field and went hitless over four at-bats. He was selected to play in the Arizona Fall League for the Salt River Rafters after the season where he was named to the Fall Stars Game. Vilade opened the 2022 season in the minor leagues with the Isotopes.

Pittsburgh Pirates
On November 9, 2022, the Pittsburgh Pirates claimed Vilade off of waivers. Vilade was optioned to the Triple-A Indianapolis Indians to begin the 2023 season.

References

External links

1999 births
Living people
Albuquerque Isotopes players
Asheville Tourists players
Baseball players from Texas
Colorado Rockies players
Grand Junction Rockies players
Lancaster JetHawks players
Major League Baseball outfielders
People from Grapevine, Texas
Salt River Rafters players